Anna Farquhar (Farquhar; after marriage, Bergengren; pen name, Margaret Allston; December 23, 1865 – ?) was an American author and editor. A singer's heart (1897) and The devil's plough (1901) were published under her maiden name, "Anna Farquhar", but she used a pseudonym, "Margaret Allston", thereafter.

Of Scotch-English ancestry, Farquhar's ancestors came to the United States in the time of Cecil Calvert, 2nd Baron Baltimore's settling in Maryland, near Baltimore. She was born in 1865, near Brookville, Indiana, her father being a lawyer and a member of Congress from that state. Her father's death made her determine upon a career for herself and she chose a musical education, but her health failed while studying in Boston, and she was ultimately obliged to give up singing, in which she had already attained fair success.

Farquhar served as assistant editor of National Magazine. She wrote for the Boston Transcript, Detroit Free Press, and Springfield Republican during her musical career. While studying vocal music in London and Paris, she was employed as a foreign correspondent to the Boston Transcript. She also did much other magazine work.

Her story The Singer's Heart expressed her professional ambitions. The Professor's Daughter was published in the Saturday Evening Post and was very popular. Under the pen name of "Margaret Allston", Her Boston Experiences initially appeared in a magazine, and book form in 1899. The Devil's Plough was a story of the early French missionaries of North America. During her life in Washington, D.C., she obtained the material for her book Her Washington Experiences, her first real success as a writer. She was also the author of Letters of a Cabinet Member's Wife, 1897.

Early life and education

Anna Farquhar was born December 23, 1865, at Brookville, Indiana. Her father, John Hanson Farquhar, was a lawyer and congressman. Her mother was Frances Mary Farquhar. After a short residence in Cincinnati, Ohio, her family moved to Indianapolis, where Congressman Farquhar became president of one of the foremost city banks.

In Indianapolis, the daughter attended private schools. While still quite young, she showed a distinct inclination toward languages and history, and an overwhelming love for music. Her particular aversion was the study of mathematics. At sixteen, she attended a boarding-school in Maryland, but soon returned to a society life, "educating her heels far better than her head will ever be educated."

Farquhar left Indianapolis for Boston at the age of 21 to study for the professional musical stage. She cultivated her voice for grand opera, sang in church, and taught singing at the same time. In order to realize the money for pursuit of her musical education, the family property was mortgaged. The death of her father several years before had made this a possibility. Here, she struggled to cultivate her voice and soon received recognition of her growing musical powers by appointment to a position in a church choir. But the raw winds of New England had already begun to undermine her health which was never very robust, and her throat was so affected that further voice lessons were useless.

Career
The next few years of life were a struggle to attain sufficient strength to warrant her application to a musical career. A residence in the genial Maryland climate and in New York City and Washington D.C. stimulated the hope that, in the end, she might accomplish the longed-for results of her studies. It was now that she first applied herself to literary work, for, not being able to sing, she found in this an outlet for artistic expression. The next years were a period of sickness and of renewed literary endeavor.

As a teacher of singing, she was still able to keep in touch with music, and, under the skillful treatment of a New York physician, the lost voice gradually returned, but it was very unstable. A visit to England shortly after a short residence in Boston, where she had held an editorship on a periodical devoted to music, decided her future career. The years of training to be a musician had unfortunately been wasted as far as permanent results were concerned, for, said London's foremost teacher of music, "Your physique and temperament can never stand the strain of the musical life." This was indeed a sad blow, but the many disappointments which had come in earlier years had perhaps prepared her for the acknowledgment of failure in physical strength to stand the wear and tear of an exacting and strenuous profession.

A Singer's Heart, published in Boston, was her first literary endeavor, and to some extent expressed the professional ambitions which she herself had experienced in her musical career. Although it was not a "popular" production, its notices were flattering, and when a certain Philadelphia paper bought twelve copies for its editorial staff, her spirits were naturally raised and stimulated to renew her literary work.

"The Inner Experiences of a Cabinet Officer's Wife" had been a faithful picture of the complexity of ambitions, which the outsider would have been astonished to meet with at the United States Capitol. It had been so true to life, that certain personages began to wonder if some of the characters were not within their own lives. That is what made this author an interrogation point which many desired to have explained; and that is the reason why "The Inner Experiences of a Cabinet Officer's Wife" was a story that found itself upon an unusual number of library tables in its days. She was well-qualified to write "The Inner Experiences of a Cabinet Officer's Wife", for the associations she had formed while living in the Capital were those which eminently fitted her for a description of the inside political and social workings of its complexities. A host of personal letters showed that some comments had struck some nerves, but the story swung gracefully on, through threatened libel suits and denunciations of every description. "There was not a single specific and living character in city life that was intentionally put down," she says, "with perhaps one exception, and that was of a woman, and by her permission."

"The Professor's Daughter" first appeared in the Saturday Evening Post, when it had its great expansion. It was the story of simple people in a simple Rhode Island country neighborhood, whose characteristics she well knew, for among them she had lived a quiet, studious life for many summers. It contained that human element which made Shakespeare and Mark Twain immortal, and it was very popular.

When still a comparatively unknown writer, Farquhar, passing by the name of "Margaret Allston", introduced herself to the readers of the Ladies' Home Journal in a series of chapters called "Her Boston Experiences", with:—"I was twenty-two years old when first went to Boston to visit the family of my father's eldest brother, Mr. John Allston, who at an early age there settled into business prosperity."  She had something to say— something witty, something satirical, something caustic. It was about baked beans, Beacon Hill, and the people who lived near by; and she said it under a name of gentle and truly puritanic simplicity, and quite in accord with the honest shafts of sarcasm she not only aimed at the dwellers of the Hub, but had before plunged, with satire quite as delicate and sharp, into that cosmopolitan assemblage of notables known as Washington society. Her Boston Experiences, which first appeared in a magazine, ran through many editions in book form. As a New Englander said:— "Any good Bostonian who doesn't mind a bit of satire at his own expense may send this description of his beloved city to strangers and foreigners with the serene conviction that they will thus gain a better idea of the place and society than any number of guide-books could afford." It was trenchant, frank and comic, and gave an excellent picture of many sides of Boston life. It stopped at least one sale of real estate by a satirical slap at a part of town the reputation of which was morally questionable, and it is said that a Cambridge professor has permanently annexed it to his lectures, to be read to the students as an antidote for some of his dryest hours. But this was not art of the highest type, and a woman who had studied the lives of Carlyle, Huxley, Darwin, Spencer, and other great thinkers of the middle nineteenth century, in order to imbibe their spirit of work and energy, was naturally desirous of accomplishing something of greater and more lasting artistic excellence.

As a result of a sympathetic acquaintance with the territory occupied by the French Jesuits at the earliest period of their missionary efforts in North America, and also with Mr. Parkman's history of their vigorous lives, she received a vivid impression of the romantic possibilities of that period. This led to a rapid development of the romantic complications surrounding the hero of The Devil's Plough, but the study of the French characteristics and habits of the seventeenth century required the painstaking investigation of several months before the plot could be expanded into a book. The material once at her command, the writing took but a short time. When the book had been completed, she was temporarily exhausted; too much dramatic force had been expended in the preparation. As a play, in fact, it was first conceived, and that is why it found such immediate favor with the dramatic profession when it appeared in book form. The story was of a struggle between pure ideals and the baser emotions, in which the higher impulse eventually triumphs. It is not strange then that her feelings were similar to that of a great — perhaps the greatest — American sculptor, who, after completing a statue of marvelous spirit and expression, was forced to retire to the quiet of a country life for full six months.

Personal life
On January 26, 1900, she married Ralph Wilhelm Bergengren (1871–1947), a Boston journalist, essayist, humorist, critic, and children's poet. The marriage took place under circumstances of unusual romance, for they were wedded at the side of her bed of illness, with only two or three witnesses present. Thereafter, she continued her literary career.

Style and themes
Her literary method was to "walk miles and miles when a story comes to me, and when my story-people begin to talk, I sit and stitch on some hand sewing (when a man would smoke) until everything is ready to go down, then it goes like an explosion of ideas, so to speak, followed by careful modelling and severe, searching criticism." With an individual who was so eager in the endeavor to perfect her art, it was indeed to be expected that the masterpiece would come, although, in her own words, she stated that,"I cannot say that I have a conquest of the world in view; my ambition always is simply to do my best."

Selected works

As Anna Farquhar
 A singer's heart, 1897
 Letters of a Cabinet Member's Wife, 1897
 The Professor's Daughter, 1899
 The devil's plough: the romantic history of a soul conflict, 1901

As Margaret Allston
 Her Boston experiences; a picture of modern Boston society and people, 1900

References

Attribution

Bibliography

External links
 

1865 births
19th-century American singers
19th-century American women singers
19th-century American writers
19th-century American women writers
19th-century pseudonymous writers
20th-century pseudonymous writers
20th-century American writers
20th-century American women writers
People from Brookville, Indiana
Singers from Indiana
Writers from Indiana
Pseudonymous women writers
Year of death unknown